"Arrival" is a 1976 composition by Swedish pop group ABBA featured on their album of the same name. It is an instrumental piece, mainly the brainchild of member Benny Andersson and had the working titles of "Fiol", "Ode to Dalecarlia" and "Arrival in Dalecarlia".

Background 
"Arrival" was the second and last composition from the group not to contain lyrics, following "Intermezzo No.1" the previous year. As with "Intermezzo No.1", the choral tune, heavily influenced by traditional Swedish folk music, was written by Benny Andersson and Björn Ulvaeus. It was recorded on 30 August 1976 at Stockholm's Metronome Studio. The title of the album, Arrival, gave the instrumental its name, rather than vice versa. It was also one of the last tracks to be recorded for the album before its release on 11 October 1976.

In 1983, a different version of the song with lyrics, called "Belle", was sung by Daniel Balavoine and Anni-Frid Lyngstad ("Frida") as part of the French musical ABBAcadabra. Also in 1983, it was re-recorded with different lyrics, and released as "Time" by B. A. Robertson and Lyngstad.

Cover versions

Mike Oldfield version 

In 1980 Mike Oldfield recorded a cover-version of the song, which is found on his QE2 album. The artwork for Oldfield's single is a recreation of ABBA's Arrival album artwork depicting the artist flying in a Bell 47G helicopter (Oldfield is indeed titled as helicopter pilot).

Track listing 
 "Arrival" – 2:46
 "Polka" (live on European tour 1980) – 3:34

 "Polka" consists of a medley of one and a half traditional Irish polkas— the first part of "The 42 Pound Cheque" and the first and second parts of "John Ryan's Polka". Mike Oldfield rearranged the parts so that he is going from the A part of "42 Pound Cheque" to the B part of "John Ryan's", then to the A part of "John Ryan's", then back to the B part of "John Ryan's". He plays through the entire medley 3 times in all, with increasingly more backup and percussion each time. Also, he has transposed these tunes to the key of G, whereas they are more commonly played in D.

Oldfield's credits 
 Mike Oldfield: Electric Guitars, African Drums, Celtic Harp, Bass Guitar, Mandolin, Spanish Guitar, Synthesizers, Vocoder, Aboriginal Rhythm Sticks, Vocals
 David Hentschel: Synthesizers, Drums, Vocals
 Maggie Reilly: Vocals
 Strings and Choir arranged by David Bedford
 Leader of Strings: Dick Studt
 Choir English Chorale

Other cover versions, sampling, etc. 
 French singer Michèle Torr covered the song and added lyrics, under the title "J'aime".
 Petula Clark also covered the song with lyrics in French, as "La Vallée".
 German dance group Scooter sampled "Arrival" in the song "Roll Baby Roll" on their 2003 album The Stadium Techno Experience, although some chords are slightly altered. For copyright reasons, they had to rewrite the track later, which sounds completely different, under the name of "Swinging In The Jungle". They can, however, play the original track in concerts. 
 British rock band The Darkness have played "Arrival" as their opening song on headlining tours since 2003.
 Sarah Brightman recorded a vocal version for her 2008 seasonal album A Winter Symphony, with previously unused lyrics from Björn Ulvaeus, which he wrote in 1999 for possible inclusion in the Mamma Mia! musical.
 ABBA tribute act Björn Again have used this as their entry music when starting a gig for many years.
 The German band Gregorian made a cover of this song, using the lyrics from the Sarah Brightman version, on their album Masters of Chant Chapter VII in 2009.
 "Arrival" was used as the theme tune for the BBC TV series Robbie, presented by Fyfe Robertson.
 German singer Annegret Behrend recorded a cover of this song in 1977 with the title "Wie ein Vogel auf dem Wind". The single was published on the label Elektra – ELK 12 253.
 Russian dance band "Section 1" covered the track in 2015 on their track "Roll & Ride".
 The Swedish metal band Ghost played this theme during their "A Final Gig Named Death" concert. Following the on-stage death of Papa Nihil during his final musical performance, front-man Cardinal Copia was subsequently anointed Papa Emeritus IV as several nuns fitted him with papal robes.

References

1976 compositions
1976 songs
1980 singles
ABBA songs
Mike Oldfield songs
Polar Music singles
Rock instrumentals
Songs written by Benny Andersson and Björn Ulvaeus
Virgin Records singles